Ali bin Abi Talib Mosque is a mosque in Irbid, Jordan. It was built originally during the Ottoman period but was renovated and expanded in 1998 to an area of roughly 600 square metres.

Irbid Governorate
Mosques in Jordan